The Pennsylvania System of School Assessment (PSSA) is a standardized test administered in public schools in the state of Pennsylvania. Students in grades 3-8 are assessed in English language arts skills and mathematics. Students in grades 4 and 8 are also assessed in skills relating to natural science, including the field of data interpretation and analysis. Since 2013, high school students have taken the Keystone Exam in place of the PSSA for their standardized testing.  The PSSA's were made by a company in New Jersey. The PSSA is written, owned and administered by Pearson Education. There are reporting categories for each subject which list eligible content to be tested in each grade. Assessment Anchors specify what is considered eligible content for each grade level tested. A Proficient or Advanced level is needed to be able to qualify as passing the PSSA.

Underlying Principles
The PSSA applies to all public schools and districts, including charter schools and cyber charter schools. The questions are based on Common Core Standards and content expectations.
The goal is to have 100% of students proficient or above in reading and math by 2014.

Scoring
There are four levels on which a student may score: advanced, proficient, basic, and below basic. The Pennsylvania Department of Education defines the four levels as follows.

Advanced

Proficient

Basic

Below Basic

Adequate Yearly Progress
Districts must meet Adequate Yearly Progress (AYP) in reading and math. To make AYP, the school and district must meet target percentages with all students, as well as with every subgroup of 40 or more students, scoring at the Advanced or Proficient level.

Schools which fail to meet AYP for two consecutive years are subject to sanctions, such as loss of funding and restaffing. Subgroups include: Economically Disadvantaged (Title I), Limited English proficiency, Students with Individualized Education Programs, Hispanic Americans, Native Americans, African Americans, Asian Americans, White Students, and Multi-racial/Multi-ethnic Students.

Reporting Categories
Math reporting categories include numbers and operations, measurement, geometry, algebraic concepts, and data analysis and probability. Reading reporting categories include reading comprehension skills as well as interpreting and analysis fiction and nonfiction texts. Science reporting categories include the nature of science, biological sciences, physical sciences, and earth and space sciences. On July 1, 2010, the State Board of Education adopted the Common Core State Standards in Mathematics, which will replace the Mathematics standards adopted in 1999.  In July 2010, the Board also adopted the Common Core State Standards in English Language Arts, which will replace the Reading, Writing, Speaking and Listening standards adopted in 1999. The regulations providing for these new academic content standards took effect upon their publication in the October 16, 2010 edition of the Pennsylvania Bulletin. The transition to Common Core began during the 2010-11 school year, and it was fully implemented by July 1, 2013.

Common Core State Standards for Mathematics 
Common Core State Standards in English Language Arts

References

External links
PA Dept. of Education

Education in Pennsylvania
Standardized tests in the United States